Swedish Board of Supervision of Estate Agents is a Swedish government agency that answers to the Ministry of Finance. The agency is located in Karlstad, Värmland's County.

It handles tasks related to the state supervision of real estate agents.

See also
Government agencies in Sweden.

External links

Board of Supervision of Estate Agents
Real estate in Sweden